Victor Hugo Gomes Silva (born 11 May 2004) is a Brazilian footballer who plays as a midfielder for Campeonato Brasileiro Série A club Flamengo.

Club career
Victor Hugo began his career with Flamengo and made his professional debut for the club on 1 May 2022 in a Copa do Brasil match against Altos. He came on as a 69th minute substitute for Marinho as Flamengo win the match 2–1. On 4 May 2022 he played his debut game in Copa Libertadores, replacing Bruno Henrique in a 2–2 draw against Talleres. On 11 May 2022, on the day of his 18th birthday, he scored his first professional goal in a 2–0 win over Altos.

Career statistics

Honours
Flamengo
 Copa Libertadores: 2022
Copa do Brasil: 2022

References

External links
 Victor Hugo at playmakerstats.com (English version of ogol.com.br)

2004 births
Living people
Brazilian footballers
Association football midfielders
CR Flamengo footballers
Copa Libertadores-winning players